The Battle of Anghiari was fought on 29 June 1440, between the forces of Milan and the League of some Italian states led by the Republic of Florence in the course of the Wars in Lombardy. The battle was a victory for the Florentines, who secured their domination of central Italy.

The battle is well known for its depiction in a failed attempt at a painting by Leonardo da Vinci, now known only by its preparatory sketches. It is also remarkable for the fact that though the battle lasted all day, involving several thousand troops, it was said that only one soldier was killed. According to Niccolò Machiavelli, after four hours of skirmishing, the single death occurred "when a soldier fell off his horse".

Battle 
The League's army concentrated on Anghiari, a small centre of Tuscany, and comprised: 4,000 Papal troops, under Cardinal Ludovico Trevisan; a Florentine contingent of around the same size, and a company of 300 men-at-arms (knights) from Venice, led by Micheletto Attendolo. Other men joined for the occasion from Anghiari itself.

The numerically superior Milanese force was led by the famous condottiero Niccolò Piccinino in the name of Duke Filippo Maria Visconti and reached the area on the night of 28 June. Some 2,000 men from the nearby town of Sansepolcro joined the Milanese. Confident in his superior manpower, and on the element of surprise Piccinino ordered an attack in the afternoon of the following day. However, the dust lifted by the Milanese on the Sansepolcro-Anghiari road was noticed by Micheletto and the League's forces were made ready for battle.

Micheletto's Venetian knights blocked the Milanese vanguard on the only bridge over the channel protecting the League's camp. Micheletto and the Venetians held the bridge allowing the greater part of the League's army to form for battle but were eventually pushed back by Milanese reinforcements led by the two captains Francesco Piccinino and Astorre II Manfredi. The Milanese advanced but their right flank was soon ferociously engaged by the Papal troops and were obliged to retreat to the bridge. The battle continued for four hours, until a surrounding manoeuvre managed to cut off a third of the Milanese on the League side of the channel. The battle continued into the night but ended with a victory for the League army.

Casualties 

The battle was described in histories written by contemporaries Leonardo Bruni and Flavio Biondo, both of whom concentrate on the actions of individuals, though there is some discussion of equipment and tactics. Machiavelli, in contrast, gives a detailed account of the strategy and tactics used by both sides, but presents the battle as "a striking example of the wretched state of military discipline in those times", arguing that the mercenary knights who ran the armies of the day had no motive to fight for victory.

Machiavelli adds that "This victory was much more advantageous to the Florentines than injurious to the duke; for, had they been conquered, Tuscany would have been his own; but he, by his defeat, only lost the horses and accoutrements of his army, which could be replaced without any very serious expense".

Whether or not the claimed single death is an exaggeration is not known. Hans Delbrück argues that,

Delbrück says that "close examination of the contemporary reports has shown that there is not a true word in this entire description". However, it is true that the warfare of the period was far less brutal than that of the later period in which Machiavelli wrote, as knights could indeed expect to surrender for ransom. While it is possible that only one mounted knight died at Anghiari, foot-soldiers are unlikely to have been as lucky. Frances S. Saunders says that "as many as 900" soldiers may in fact have died in the battle.

Cultural depictions 

According to Pia F. Cuneo, "Anghiari is one of the most frequently represented battles of the era". The earliest known image, painted within a decade of the battle, is a cassone panel by an unknown artist known as the Anghiari Master, which emphasises the tournament-like nature of the conflict, with banners and ritual engagements.

More than seven decades later, the battle was the subject of a now-lost painting by Leonardo da Vinci, known through copies of the central scene made by other artists. The known portion of the painting depicted a battle over a standard between knights on opposing sides. The picture was commissioned to occupy one of the walls of the council chamber of the Florentine republic in the Palazzo Vecchio. The other wall was to have a painting by Michelangelo depicting an earlier Florentine victory at the Battle of Cascina in 1364.

A 1687 relief sculpture depicting the battle by Baroque artist Giovanni Battista Foggini in Santa Maria del Carmine, Florence depicts Saint Andrew Corsini guiding the Florentine forces to victory.

References

External links 
 Official website of Anghiari

1440 in Europe
1440s in the Holy Roman Empire
15th century in the Republic of Florence
Anghiari 1440
Anghiari 1440
Anghiari 1440
Anghiari 1440
Anghiari
Anghiari